Susan Misner (born February 8, 1971) is an American actress and dancer. She has appeared in a number of TV series as a guest star, as well as several recurring roles.

Career

Misner portrayed Grace Davidson on the ABC soap opera One Life to Live from March 12, 1999, to November 17, 1999. In 2002, Misner appeared in the film Chicago as Liz, performing the "Cell Block Tango" number.

Misner has guest starred on many TV series, including three of the series in the Law & Order franchise—Law & Order: Criminal Intent (2001/2005), Law & Order: Special Victims Unit (2002) and Law & Order (2006)—as well as both CSI: Crime Scene Investigation (2002) and CSI: Miami (2004). She appeared as Theresa on Rescue Me (2006–07), and later as Gretchen Martin in the 2007 miniseries The Bronx Is Burning. She appeared in two episodes of the hit CBS procedural Without a Trace during the 2004–2005 television season. In several episodes of the first season (2011) in Person of Interest, Misner played opposite Jim Caviezel as his ex-girlfriend Jessica in flashbacks. In 2017, Misner had a guest appearance as Philomena on The Blacklist.

She portrayed Alison Humphrey in several episodes of The CW series Gossip Girl and Sergeant Burnett in New Amsterdam (2008). In 2010, she played the girlfriend of therapist Paul Weston in the series In Treatment. More recently, she has the role of Sandra Beeman in The Americans, and the recurring role of Simone Canning in The Good Wife.

Personal life
Misner grew up in Pompton Plains, New Jersey.

Filmography

Film

Television

References

External links

1971 births
Living people
20th-century American actresses
21st-century American actresses
Actresses from New Jersey
American female dancers
American dancers
American film actresses
American soap opera actresses
American television actresses
Outstanding Performance by a Cast in a Motion Picture Screen Actors Guild Award winners
American people of German descent
Actors from Paterson, New Jersey
People from Pequannock Township, New Jersey